The Drayman and the King is a 1989 Soviet comedy film directed by Vladimir Alenikov.

Plot 
The film takes place in the legendary Moldavanka. The film tells the story of the attractive bandit Benya Krik named King, the son of a binder, who leaves the family for the beautiful Marusa.

Cast 
 Armen Dzhigarkhanyan as Mendel Krik
 Zinoviy Gerdt as Arie Leib
 Raisa Nedashkovskaya as Nekhama
 Irina Rozanova as Maruska
 Maksim Leonidov as Benya Krik
 Andrey Urgant as Levka
 Tatyana Vasileva
 Roman Kartsev as Boyarsky
 Yevgeny Evstigneev as Nikifor
 Mariya Itkina

References

External links 
 

1989 films
1980s Russian-language films
Soviet comedy films
Films directed by Vladimir Alenikov
1989 comedy films